Tixocortol pivalate is a corticosteroid.  It has anti-inflammatory properties similar to hydrocortisone.  It is marketed under the brand name Pivalone.

It is sometimes used in patch testing in atopic dermatitis.

See also
 Tixocortol

References

Corticosteroid esters
Corticosteroids